Sonnet 52 is one of 154 sonnets written by the English playwright and poet William Shakespeare. It is a member of the Fair Youth sequence, in which the poet expresses his love towards a young man.

Structure
Sonnet 52 is an English or Shakespearean sonnet. It contains three quatrains followed by a final rhyming couplet. It follows the typical rhyme scheme of the English sonnet, ABAB CDCD EFEF GG, and is composed in iambic pentameter, a type of poetic metre based on five pairs of metrically weak/strong syllabic positions. The twelfth line exemplifies a regular iambic pentameter:

 ×  /  ×  /  ×    /  ×   / ×      / 
By new unfolding his imprison'd pride. (52.12)

The fourth line has a final extrametrical syllable or feminine ending (as does the second line). It also has its second ictus moved to the right (resulting in a four-position figure, × × / /, sometimes referred to as a minor ionic):

 ×    /  ×     ×  /    /    ×   /  ×    / (×) 
For blunting the fine point of seldom pleasure. (52.4)
/ = ictus, a metrically strong syllabic position. × = nonictus. (×) = extrametrical syllable.

The meter demands some variant pronunciations: the second line's "uplockèd", the seventh's "placèd", and the eighth's "jewels" all count as two syllables. In the fourteenth line, the first occurrence of "being" is one syllable, the second is two syllables.

Notes

References

External links
Analysis

British poems
Sonnets by William Shakespeare